The Garworlohn Township is a township of the Greater Monrovia District, Montserrado County, Liberia. It is located on Bushrod Island, and stretches from Vai Town in the south to Bong Mines Bridge in the north. Politically, Garworlohn Township is divided between the Montserrado-13, Montserrado-14 and Montserrado-15 electoral districts.

During the Presidency of Ellen Johnson-Sirleaf, Willametta Gooding Carlos served as commissioner of Garworlohn Township. Beatrice Dolee Williams was named commissioner by President George Weah in 2018.

Communities of Garworlohn Township

References

City corporations, townships and borough of the Greater Monrovia District